François Petit (born March 27, 1975) is a French professional sport climber and rock climber, known for winning the Lead Climbing World Championship in 1997 and the Lead Climbing World Cup in 1995 and 1999.

Career 
Born in Albertville, near the Vanoise National Park, Petit started climbing when he was a child, encouraged by his passionate parents. He shared his passion with his older brother and also 1996 Lead Climbing World Cup winner, .

He retired from international competitions in 2004. Since 2010 he has been the trainer of the French bouldering team. He is also the director of Le Mur de Lyon, one of the largest indoor climbing gyms in France, located in Lyon.

Rankings

Climbing World Cup

Climbing World Championships

Number of medals in the Climbing World Cup

Lead

Rock climbing

Single-pitch routes 
8c+/5.14c:
 Superplafond - Volx (FRA) - 1995 - bolted by Jean-Baptiste Tribout in 1994
 Le Bronx - Orgon (FRA) - 1994 - first ascent

Multi-pitch routes 
 Bonington - Torres del Paine (PAT - January 2007
 Eternal Flame - Trango Towers (PAK) - July 20–22, 2005

See also
List of grade milestones in rock climbing
History of rock climbing
Rankings of most career IFSC gold medals

References

External links 

French rock climbers
1975 births
Living people
IFSC Climbing World Championships medalists
IFSC Climbing World Cup overall medalists